SMVT Bengaluru–Mangaluru Central Tri-weekly Express is  an Express train belonging to South Western Railway zone of Indian Railways that run between  and  in India.

Background
This train was inaugurated on 21 February 2019, Flagged off by Nalin Kumar Kateel an MP of Dakshin Kannada for connectivity between the Mangalore to Bangalore.

Service
The frequency of this train is three days a week, it covers the distance of 363 km with an average speed of 34 km/hr.

Routes
This train passes through Chikkabanavara, Kunigal, Shravanabelagola,  and Sakleshpur on both sides.

Traction
As this route is currently going to be electrified, a WDP-4 based loco pulls the train to its destination in both directions

References

External links
 16585 Yesvantpur Mangaluru Central Express
 16586 Mangaluru Central Yesvantpur Express

Express trains in India
Rail transport in Karnataka
Transport in Mangalore
Transport in Bangalore